Let Me Feel Your Power is the tenth live album by British heavy metal band Saxon. The title comes from the third track on their seventeenth studio album, The Inner Sanctum. Originally, it was to be released on 23 September 2016, but the release date was pushed back to 7 October. In the US, the release date was 28 October.

Recording
The album was recorded during their ongoing tour in support of their twenty-first studio album, Battering Ram,  and was compiled from live shows performed at three different locations, which are:
 Zenith - Munich, Germany (21 November 2015) 
 The Old Market - Hove, England (23 January 2016)
 Arcada Theatre - St. Charles, Illinois (20 September 2015) - labelled by UDR as 'bonus material'.

Motörhead performed at the Zenith on the same days as Saxon - their sets were also recorded and were released as a live album and video called Clean Your Clock in June 2016.

Included are thirteen songs from Munich, three from Hove and eighteen from St. Charles, although the last song of the St. Charles performance (20,000 Ft) isn't included, possibly due to space limitations.

Release

Formats
 DVD and two CDs (digipak)
 Blu-Ray disc and two CDs (digipak)
 Digital download 
 Two LPs, two CDs and a Blu-Ray disc - limited to 1500 copies

Track listing

On 1 September, this track was made available as an iTunes purchase. Those who pre-ordered the album on iTunes could download it for free.
These songs are only available as video content on the DVD and Blu-Ray versions and aren't included as part of the CD/LP/digital versions.

Personnel
 Biff Byford – lead vocals
 Paul Quinn – guitar
 Doug Scarratt – guitar
 Nibbs Carter – bass guitar
 Nigel Glockler - drums

References 

2016 live albums
Saxon (band) live albums